The 2012 Dalian Shide F.C. season is Dalian's 23rd consecutive season in the top division of Chinese football, and the last season before the team disbanded. Shide also competed in the Chinese FA Cup.

Players

As of 5 March 2012

First team

Reserve squad

On loan

Competitions

Chinese Super League

League table

Matches

Chinese FA Cup

References

Dalian Shide F.C. seasons
Dalian Shide F.C.